Leylan District is in Malekan County, East Azerbaijan province, Iran. At the 2006 National Census, its population was 23,234 in 5,341 households. The following census in 2011 counted 24,169 people in 6,688 households. At the latest census in 2016, the district had 25,381 inhabitants in 7,526 households.

References 

Malekan County

Districts of East Azerbaijan Province

Populated places in East Azerbaijan Province

Populated places in Malekan County